Shaheb Bibi Golaam is an Indian Bengali thriller film directed by Pratim D. Gupta and stars Anjan Dutt, Swastika Mukherjee and Ritwick Chakraborty in the lead roles. The film depicts the story of a contract killer, a housewife and a taxi driver from a Metropolitan city. The music is released by Amara Muzik.

Cast 
 Anjan Dutt as Jimmy
 Swastika Mukherjee as Jaya
 Ritwick Chakraborty as Javed
 Parno Mittra as Rumi
 Vikram Chatterjee as Zico Roy
Alokananda Roy
 Sudip Mukherjee
 Suman Mukherjee
 Avishek De Biswas as Nakul

Production

Development 
Pratim D. Gupta clarified the fact that the film is neither an adaptation of the novel of the same name by Bimal Mitra, nor does it have any connection with the earlier film adaptations of the novel. The story of the film has been totally created by Gupta himself and the script was written five years before the development, prior to Paanch Adhyay.

Though titles like Jimmy Jaya Javed and Trikaal were initially into consideration for the film, it was finally chosen to be Shaheb Bibi Golaam.

Casting 
The film marks the first collaboration between the director and the lead actors. Though Mukherjee was initially opted for the female lead in Paanch Adhyay, the role later switched over to Dia Mirza. Anjan Dutt instantly gave a nod to the film when he heard the script while being in a casual discussion with Gupta. Dutt will be playing the role of a middle-aged Anglo-Indian contract-killer and Mukherjee's character will be that of middle-class housewife. Ritwick Chakraborty will be portraying the role of a taxi driver, who is in a relationship with the character played by Parno Mittra.

Filming 
Shooting for the film started from November 2014.

Music 
The music for Shaheb Bibi Golaam is composed by Anupam Roy and the lyrics have been penned by Anupam himself. The music rights have been acquired by Amara Muzik. The full music album was released on 6 August 2016.

Awards and nominations

References 

Bengali-language Indian films
2010s Bengali-language films
2016 films
Films scored by Anupam Roy